Elvira Notari (born Elvira Coda; 10 February 1875 – 17 December 1946) was an Italian film director, one of the country's earliest and most prolific female filmmaker. She is credited as the first woman who made over sixty feature films and about a hundred shorts and documentaries, quite often writing the subjects and screenplays, inspired by Naples. The Elvira Notari Prize is named after her.

She was of modest social origins. She married Nicola Notari. Together they founded Dora Film, and she became the first Italian woman to create a family film production company. She directed the films, while he worked as a cameraman. Their son, Eduardo or 'Gennariello,' based on a character he played, worked as an actor in many of the films. Eduardo nicknamed his mother, “The General,” based on her strong will and determination displayed in her film company. In an example, tears on screen for her films had to be real, brought up from a ‘painful or emotionally sensitive detail of a player’s private life,’ rather than the use of glycerin for artificial tears.

Early life
She was born to Diego Coda and Agnese Vignes. Elvira was uncommonly allowed to attend school and pursue an education at the School of Science in literature while dancing as a hobby. In school, she developed her skills in the use of language and this was shown in her writing. In 1902, when she finished school she and her family moved to Naples. She worked as a “milliner” which she continued to do even after she became a film maker. Where after some time she found and in August 1902, married Nicola Notari. They had three children, Eduardo, Dora and Maria.

Career
Elvira along with her husband established their production company. After a few name changes they settled on Dora Films, which was named after her daughter, whom never worked in the business. Dora Films began small as a simple photographic laboratory in 1905. Notari's company stood out with their hand-colored film titles called Cinecittà, which were used to preview events and attractions. It was not until 1912 that the Dora Film company built a stage set, or teatro di posa¸ and became a full-fledged production house. Her husband worked the camera while Elvira directed and wrote the films. She is credited as the first woman film director. Most of the work done by Dora films was lost, with only a few records remaining. Dora Films was a true production company, which included editing, labs and other necessities to create films. The live synchronization of music and songs with the images on screen, often hand-drawn or machine colored, are quite possibly the form multimedia form of entertainment ever.

By the 1920s, the Notari's films had to be distributed throughout the American market as they were denied national circulation in Italy, despite being one of, if not the most, successful and important production company of Italian Cinema for the times. Dora Films eventually formed an office in New York, fittingly enough in Little Italy; the films made brought Italian immigrants together and gave education to ideas of Italy for those unaware.

Dora films also had an acting school of cinematic art. At Dora Films, Elvira produced documentaries and short films. According to a testimony by her son, Elvira was one to demand a real and true performance from her actors. The films produced at Dora films were done through a female gaze as well as dealing with natural life in Italy. Elvira would remind her actors about sad moments in her life. This was “reminiscent of neorealism”. Elvira is credited with contributing to the acting school as well as being a scriptwriter. It is understood that she might have also worked on the editing of the films they produced.

Elvira Notari relied on women's literature when it came to the development of her ideas. In her “female melodramas” she focuses on the female perspective. Elvira had a tendency of portraying the "dark woman", the femme fatale, a woman who deviated from the norm. There was a focus on the female body as well as female fantasy, which is an aspect of Elvira Natori's work. In her works 'Nfama! and A Piedigrotta the female leads are described as the "unruly female figure"[6] the films go on to portray the struggle of these women. One of the other themes in her films, that present these types of women, is desire. Men desiring women, women desiring some sort of feeling or emotion.

Censorship in Italy had come down on Dora films. The films shined a light on aspects of Italian life that many found unsuitable to be portrayed. The films often dealt with “crude language and sexual undertones,” which tested the idea of censorship. Censorship often asked for scenes to be edited or removed. Furthermore, Notari’s decline came through Fascist intervention in her own home and she inevitable shifted to Hollywood-style film, including soundtrack over her original live singers signature, with her film Napoli terra d’amore (1928) being a disaster with her public. A slight revival with her film, Trionfo cristiano (1930) (though the release date is controversial), Notari shifted once again to religious themes, again controversially due to desire for its identity change or potentially just the popularity of the style.

Moreover and more recently, Notari’s film, A Santanotte (1922), was restored between 2007-2008, piecing together titles explaining the censorship of a multitude of depictions within the film ranging from physical violence to drinking and more. These depictions gave Notari a difficult time with United States censorships as well, though she found success in the United States verified through ads.

Style and themes 
The feature films made by Notari were often based on Neapolitan (especially middle-class women) forms of drama. Notari shifted to the sceneggiata, a hybrid theatrical form drawing on popular dramatic songs and the variety stage, by the early 1920s, and shot on the streets of Naples using non-professional actors. The amateur actors gave realistic vibes to her films, while each of Notari's scenes utilized the street as a natural stage filled with lights, crowds, and their voices alike, rather than shot in a Cinecittà. Notari defined her passionate dramas as part of a series defined by her as grandi lavori popolari (“great popular works”). The Notari's realist touch has been linked to the later neorealist movement. Elvira Notari's work presented a lot of windows representing several aspect, as well as the city being of extreme importance, especially due to her style of location shooting. Further, the city and windows expand on Notari's public and private stories, with nodes to men being part of the public space while the women the domestic space. Though Notari often featured women in the public space, they were often surrounded by men.

Later life 
At the end of Dora films in 1930, Elvira and her husband moved on in the film industry through the 1930s. Due to the incoming of sound in films and the rise of censorship, Dora films ended. Though lack of desire and sound may not be the reason she truly retired, but solely on the censorship front. Furthermore, it may also be due to the fact that it was must for Italian filmmakers to move to Rome due to the governments choices and Elvira had no desire to. Elvira moved to Cava de ‘Tirreni, near Salerno, where she retired and eventually passed on December 17, 1946. The Notari’s started a photography equipment store . Later on her husband became a film distributor .

Filmography

References

Sources
 Giuliana Bruno, Streetwalking on a Ruined Map: Cultural Theory and the City Films of Elvira Notari, Princeton University Press, 1993
 Gwendolyn Audrey Foster, Women film directors: an international bio-critical dictionary, Greenwood Publishing Group, 1995 
 
 
 
 
Scalia, Rossella (2013). "Elvira Notari: A Woman in Search of Desire." Film International.

Further reading 
 Scalia, Rossella (2013). "Elvira Notari: A Woman in Search of Desire." Film International.Desire". Film International.
 Tomadjoglou, Kim. "Elvira Notari." In Jane Gaines, Radha Vatsal, and Monica Dall’Asta, eds. Women Film Pioneers Project. Center for Digital Research and Scholarship. New York, NY: Columbia University Libraries, 2013. Web.   September 27, 2013.   <https://wfpp.cdrs.columbia.edu/pioneer/ccp-elvira-notari/>

External links

 Elvira Notari at the Women Film Pioneers Project
Elvira Notari: A Woman in Search of Desire at Film International
Naples Life, Death & Miracle at Naplesldm.
Great Italians of the Past: Elvira Coda Notari at WeTheItalians

1875 births
1946 deaths
Italian film directors
People from Salerno
Silent film directors
Italian women film directors
Women film pioneers
Italian women screenwriters
Italian women film editors
20th-century Italian screenwriters
20th-century Italian women writers